The Turonian is, in the ICS' geologic timescale, the second age in the Late Cretaceous Epoch, or a stage in the Upper Cretaceous Series. It spans the time between 93.9 ± 0.8 Ma and 89.8 ± 1 Ma (million years ago). The Turonian is preceded by the Cenomanian Stage and underlies the Coniacian Stage.

At the beginning of the Turonian an oceanic anoxic event (OAE 2) took place, also referred to as the Cenomanian-Turonian boundary event or the "Bonarelli Event".

Stratigraphic definition

The Turonian (French: Turonien) was defined by the French paleontologist Alcide d'Orbigny (1802–1857) in 1842. Orbigny named it after the French city of Tours in the region of Touraine (department Indre-et-Loire), which is the original type locality.

The base of the Turonian Stage is defined as the place where the ammonite species Watinoceras devonense first appears in the stratigraphic column. The official reference profile (the GSSP) for the base of the Turonian is located in the Rock Canyon anticline near Pueblo, Colorado (United States, coordinates: 38° 16' 56" N, 104° 43' 39" W).

The top of the Turonian Stage (the base of the Coniacian) is defined as the place in the stratigraphic column where the inoceramid bivalve species Cremnoceramus rotundatus first appears.

Subdivision
The Turonian is sometimes subdivided in Lower/Early, Middle and Upper/Late substages or subages. In the Tethys domain, it contains the following ammonite biozones:
zone of Subprionocyclus neptuni (in the Upper Turonian)
zone of Collignoniceras woollgari (in the Middle Turonian)
zone of Mammites nodosoides
zone of Watinoceras coloradoense or Watinoceras devonense (last two both in the Lower Turonian)

Other important index fossils are species of the inoceramid genus Inoceramus (I. schloenbachi, I. lamarcki and I. labiatus). Inoceramids are bivalve Mollusca related to today's mussels.

References

Literature
; 2004: A Geologic Time Scale 2004, Cambridge University Press.
; 2005: The Global Boundary Stratotype Section and Point for the base of the Turonian Stage of the Cretaceous: Pueblo, Colorado, U.S.A., Episodes 28(2): pp 93–104.

External links
GeoWhen Database - Turonian
Late Cretaceous timescale, at the website of the subcommission for stratigraphic information of the ICS
 Turonian Microfossils: 48 images of Foraminifera

 
02
Geological ages
Cretaceous geochronology